The Lober is a river of Saxony and Saxony-Anhalt, Germany. It flows into the Mulde near Pouch. Its course has been heavily affected by lignite mining; its lower course is a canal, also called Lober-Leine-Kanal. The Lober flows through the town Delitzsch.

See also
List of rivers of Saxony
List of rivers of Saxony-Anhalt

Rivers of Saxony
Rivers of Saxony-Anhalt
Rivers of Germany